Stal Rzeszów is a Polish football club based in Rzeszów, Poland, as part of a multi-sports club.

History 

The history of Stal Rzeszow dates back to November 1944, when a group of sports enthusiasts, working at WSK PZL Rzeszow (Transport Equipment Enterprise) decided to form a Sports Circle. With support of the Youth Organization of the Association of Workers University (Organizacja Mlodziezy Towarzystwa Uniwersytetu Robotniczego, OM TUR), the new club was managed by Bronislaw Szczoczarz.

In March 1945, football team of PZL OM TUR was formed, under manager Jan Polak. In its first game, OM TUR faced Szturmowiec (Walter) Rzeszow, the match ended in a 2–2 draw. By the summer of 1945, OM TUR played several friendly games, facing Sokol Rzeszow (4–6), Czuwaj Lancut (2–6), and in June 1945, it played in the City of Rzeszow Cup tournament, losing in the final 1–3 to Resovia.

In the autumn of 1946, a series of playoffs took place, in order to find best teams for the newly created Rzeszow A-Class. PZL OM TUR managed to qualify to the league, together with such teams, as Legia Krosno, Nafta Krosno, Orzel Gorlice, Sanoczanka, Cukrownia Przeworsk, Resovia, Sokol Rzeszów, Czuwaj Przemysl and Polonia Przemysl. By 1955, however, the team did not have its own field, and had to use the fields of other clubs. On 26 June 1955, the first game took place at the newly built PZL Rzeszow stadium, at Hetmanska Street. The reserve team of Poland B faced Bulgarian reserves (1–1). In the second game of the day, Stal Rzeszow, the host, tied 1–1 with Poland U-19 team.

On 15 February 1948 the name of the club was changed into Union Sports Club of Metal Workers PZL Rzeszow (Zwiakzkowy Klub Sportowy Metalowców PZL w Rzeszowie). The club was overseen by the Central Union of Metal Workers, based in Katowice. By 1949, PZL Rzeszow had six departments: boxing (since 1944), football (since 1945), track and field (since 1945), chess (since 1947), table tennis (since 1948), speedway (since 1949). Finally, in May 1949, the name of the club was changed into Union Sports Club (Zakładowy Klub Sportowy) Stal Rzeszow.

In 1953, Stal qualified to the semifinal of the Polish Cup, where it lost 3–4 to AKS Chorzow. In 1956, Stal won regional games of Rzeszow League (III level of Polish football tier), qualifying to the Second Division playoffs, where it faced Piast Gliwice (2–2, 1–0), and Arkonia Szczecin (0–2, 2–0)

After the promotion, several players joined Stal for the upcoming 1957/58 season of the Second Division. Before the games, Polish Football Association decided to form two groups of the second level. Stal was in Group South, among such sides, as Cracovia, Garbarnia Kraków, Wawel Kraków, Piast Gliwice, Concordia Knurow, Bron Radom, Stal Mielec, AKS Chelmek, Naprzod Lipiny, Szombierki Bytom, AKS Chorzow.

In its first game, Stal faced Szombierki, beating the opponent 2–1. After the first round, Stal was in the 8th position, and after the whole season, Stal had 22 points, with goals 40–30, which made it the 6th team of the group. 
  
In mid-1958, Tadeusz Hogendorf became new manager of Stal. By the end of the season, Stal was very lucky to avoid relegation. In 1960, Stal was 8th; in 1961, 5th; and in 1962, 9th. Before the 1962 season, PZPN divided the Second Division into two groups: A and B. Stal was in Group A, which consisted of 8 teams (Unia Raciborz, Unia Tarnów, Naprzód Lipiny, Piast Gliwice, MZKS Krosno, Polonia Bydgoszcz, Slavia Ruda Slaska), and won the games, qualifying to the Ekstraklasa. The decisive game took place on 21 June 1962 in Rzeszow, vs. Piast Gliwice. With the attendance of 25,000, Stal won 2–1.

In July 1962, Stal went on a summer camp in Finland. First Ekstraklasa game took place on 12 August 1962: Stal lost 0–1 at home to Lechia Gdańsk. In the second game, Stal lost in Krakow to Wisła Kraków (0–2). First, historic victory took place in the third round, when Stal beat at home 3–0 ŁKS Łódź.

Stal remained in the Ekstraklasa for ten years, until 1972. It was regarded as an average team, without major successes. Its top player at that time was Jan Domarski, who capped for Poland 17 times.

In 2012 a joint-stock company was established which took over the original club. Stal currently plays in the II liga. From April 2018, the main sponsor of the team is Fibrain - a Polish manufacturer of fiber optic solutions.

On 27 April 2022 Stal gained promotion to the I liga following Ruch Chorzów's draw against Wisła Puławy. On 1 May 2022, after a 4–1 away win against Pogoń Siedlce, Stal secured the II liga title with 3 games left.

Achievements and Honours 
 Polish Cup:
Winners (1): 1975
Semifinalist (1): 1974
Quarterfinalist (4): 1972, 1976, 1991, 1992

Ekstraklasa: 
Best finish: 7th in 1966
Participation: 11x

Second Division:
Winners (2): 1962, 1974-75

Third Division
Winners (4): 1956, 1979-80, 1983-84, 1986-87, 2021-22
Runners-up (6): 1953, 1954, 1977-78, 1978-79, 1982-83, 1985-86

Fourth Division
Winners (4): 1998-99, 2001-02, 2014-15, 2018-19
Runners-up (6): 2008-09, 2015-16

European Cup Winners' Cup:
Second Round: 1975-76Polish U-19 Championship:Bronze Medal (3x):''' 1983, 1986, 2010

Current squad 
.

Out on loan

European record

Domestic record

See also 

 Football in Poland
 List of football teams
 Champions' Cup/League
 UEFA Cup

References

External links 
  Official website

 
1944 establishments in Poland
Association football clubs established in 1944
Football clubs in Poland
Sport in Rzeszów